This is a list of European Union member states by health expense per person.

Map 
The table uses 2013 data from the World Bank. Numbers are in international dollar.

Table 
The table uses an interval of years from the World Bank. Numbers are in international dollars.

See also
List of European Union member states by minimum wage
List of European Union member states by average wage
Economy of the European Union

Plotted maps
European countries by electricity consumption per person
European countries by employment in agriculture (% of employed)
European countries by fossil fuel use (% of total energy)
European countries by military expenditure as a percentage of government expenditure
European countries by percent of population aged 0-14
European countries by percentage of urban population
European countries by percentage of women in national parliaments
List of sovereign states in Europe by life expectancy
List of sovereign states in Europe by number of Internet users

References

External links 

EU
Health expense per person
Member states by health expense per person
Health and the European Union
Lists of countries by per capita values